The Club of the Big Deed or The Union of a Great Cause is a 1927 Soviet silent historical drama film directed by Grigori Kozintsev and Leonid Trauberg about 1825 Decembrist revolt.

Cast
 Emil Gal as Gambler
 Sergei Gerasimov as Medoks
 Konstantin Khokhlov as General Vishnevsky
 Andrei Kostrichkin as Servant of Medoks
 Sofiya Magarill as Vishnevskaya
 Mikhael Mishel as General Weismar
 Pyotr Sobolevsky as Sukhanov
 Oleg Zhakov as Young soldier
 Yanina Zheymo as Circus actress

References

External links

1927 films
Lenfilm films
Soviet black-and-white films
Soviet silent feature films
Films directed by Grigori Kozintsev
Films directed by Leonid Trauberg
Soviet historical drama films
1920s historical drama films
1927 drama films
Silent historical drama films
1920s Russian-language films